"The End" is a song with music by Jimmy Krondes and lyrics by Sid Jacobson.   In 1958, the song was released in the United States as a 1958 single by Earl Grant.  Grant's single on the Decca label, featured the orchestra of Charles "Bud" Dant; some pressings of the single were shown with the title "(At) The End (Of A Rainbow)".

Chart performance
The single was Grant's only entry into the U.S. Top 40, and spent 19 weeks on the Billboard Hot 100 reaching No. 7, while reaching No. 16 on Billboard's "Hot R&B Sides".

Grant also released a German version of the song, titled Jeder Tag geht zu Ende (Every Day Comes to an End), which reached No. 12 on the German charts.

Cover versions
Nancy Sinatra recorded a cover version for her 1966 album Nancy in London. 
Steve Lawrence released a cover in 1973 which reached No. 46 on the Billboard Easy Listening survey.

In popular culture
The song was featured in the sixth episode of the Marvel Cinematic Universe show Moon Knight, "Gods and Monsters".

References

1958 singles
1958 songs
Decca Records singles
Songs written by Sid Jacobson
Steve Lawrence songs